The 2008–09 Dallas Mavericks season was the 29th season of the franchise in the National Basketball Association (NBA). The season marked by the arrival of former NBA Coach of the Year, Rick Carlisle who was hired on May 9, 2008 following the firing of Avery Johnson after the 2008 NBA playoffs.

Finishing at 50–32 as the number six seed, the Mavericks defeated the San Antonio Spurs in the opening round of the playoffs in five games to advance to the Conference Semi-finals for the first time since 2006. They were, however, unable to defeat the Carmelo Anthony-led Denver Nuggets in the next round as they lost in five games. The Nuggets would go on to the Conference Finals, where they lost to the eventual champion Los Angeles Lakers in six games.

Key dates
 June 26: The 2008 NBA draft will take place in New York City.
 July 1: The free agency period will start.

Draft picks

Roster
{| class="toccolours" style="font-size: 95%; width: 100%;"
|-
! colspan="2" style="background-color: #0B60AD; color: #D3D3D3; text-align: center;" | 2008–09 Dallas Mavericks final roster
|- style="background-color: #072156; color: #FFFFFF; text-align: center;"
! Players !! Coaches
|-
| valign="top" |
{| class="sortable" style="background:transparent; margin:0px; width:100%;"
! Pos. !! # !! Nat. !! Name !! Height !! Weight !! DOB (Y–M–D) !! From
|-

Regular season

Standings

Record vs. opponents

Game log

|- align="center" bgcolor="#ffcccc"
| 1
| October 30
| Houston
| 
| Dirk Nowitzki (36)
| Josh Howard (11)
| Jason Kidd (12)
| American Airlines Center20,066
| 0–1

|- align="center" bgcolor="#ccffcc"
| 2
| November 1
| @ Minnesota
| 
| Dirk Nowitzki (21)
| Jason Kidd (9)
| Jason Kidd (7)
| Target Center16,893
| 1–1
|- align="center" bgcolor="#ffcccc"
| 3
| November 3
| Cleveland
| 
| Josh Howard (18)
| DeSagana Diop (9)
| Jason Kidd (6)
| American Airlines Center19,923
| 1–2
|- align="center" bgcolor="#ccffcc"
| 4
| November 4
| @ San Antonio
| 
| Dirk Nowitzki (30)
| Josh Howard (12)
| Jason Kidd (10)
| AT&T Center17,398
| 2–2
|- align="center" bgcolor="#ffcccc"
| 5
| November 7
| @ Denver
| 
| Dirk Nowitzki (23)
| Dirk Nowitzki, Jason Kidd, Brandon Bass (10)
| Jason Kidd (9)
| Pepsi Center19,175
| 2–3
|- align="center" bgcolor="#ffcccc"
| 6
| November 9
| @ L.A. Clippers
| 
| Dirk Nowitzki (33)
| Gerald Green (12)
| Jason Kidd (9)
| Staples Center14,249
| 2–4
|- align="center" bgcolor="#ffcccc"
| 7
| November 11
| L.A. Lakers
| 
| Jason Terry (21)
| Erick Dampier (16)
| Jason Kidd (10)
| American Airlines Center20,391
| 2–5
|- align="center" bgcolor="#ffcccc"
| 8
| November 13
| @ Chicago
| 
| Josh Howard (21)
| Erick Dampier (18)
| Dirk Nowitzki (5)
| United Center21,751
| 2–6
|- align="center" bgcolor="#ffcccc"
| 9
| November 14
| Orlando
| 
| Josh Howard (25)
| Josh Howard, Erick Dampier (9)
| Jason Kidd (6)
| American Airlines Center20,085
| 2–7
|- align="center" bgcolor="#ccffcc"
| 10
| November 16
| @ New York
| 
| Dirk Nowitzki (39)
| Dirk Nowitzki (15)
| Jason Kidd (9)
| Madison Square Garden19,271
| 3–7
|- align="center" bgcolor="#ccffcc"
| 11
| November 18
| @ Charlotte
| 
| Dirk Nowitzki (32)
| Erick Dampier (11)
| Jason Kidd (10)
| Time Warner Cable Arena10,935
| 4–7
|- align="center" bgcolor="#ccffcc"
| 12
| November 19
| @ Houston
| 
| Jason Terry (31)
| Dirk Nowitzki (12)
| Jason Kidd (7)
| Toyota Center18,203
| 5–7
|- align="center" bgcolor="#ccffcc"
| 13
| November 21
| Memphis
| 
| Dirk Nowitzki (25)
| Jason Kidd (13)
| Jason Kidd (6)
| American Airlines Center20,035
| 6–7
|- align="center" bgcolor="#ccffcc"
| 14
| November 25
| Indiana
| 
| Jason Terry (29)
| Dirk Nowitzki (12)
| Jason Kidd (13)
| American Airlines Center19,996
| 7–7
|- align="center" bgcolor="#ffcccc"
| 15
| November 28
| @ L.A. Lakers
| 
| Jason Terry (29)
| Dirk Nowitzki (12)
| Jason Kidd (11)
| Staples Center18,997
| 7–8
|- align="center" bgcolor="#ccffcc"
| 16
| November 29
| @ Sacramento
| 
| Jason Terry (24)
| Erick Dampier (13)
| Jason Kidd (8)
| ARCO Arena12,650
| 8–8

|- align="center" bgcolor="#ccffcc"
| 17
| December 2
| L.A. Clippers
| 
| Dirk Nowitzki (29)
| Dirk Nowitzki (10)
| Jason Kidd (8)
| American Airlines Center19,670
| 9–8
|- align="center" bgcolor="#ccffcc"
| 18
| December 4
| Phoenix
| 
| Dirk Nowitzki (39)
| Erick Dampier (14)
| Jason Kidd (8)
| American Airlines Center19,813
| 10–8
|- align="center" bgcolor="#ccffcc"
| 19
| December 6
| Atlanta
| 
| Dirk Nowitzki (24)
| Dirk Nowitzki, Erick Dampier (11)
| Jason Kidd (8)
| American Airlines Center19,966
| 11–8
|- align="center" bgcolor="#ffcccc"
| 20
| December 9
| San Antonio
| 
| Dirk Nowitzki (35)
| Dirk Nowitzki (10)
| Jason Kidd (12)
| American Airlines Center19,937
| 11–9
|- align="center" bgcolor="#ccffcc"
| 21
| December 11
| Charlotte
| 
| Jason Terry (26)
| Dirk Nowitzki (13)
| Jason Kidd (7)
| American Airlines Center19,736
| 12–9
|- align="center" bgcolor="#ccffcc"
| 22
| December 13
| Oklahoma City
| 
| Dirk Nowitzki (46)
| Brandon Bass (9)
| Jason Kidd (7)
| American Airlines Center20,190
| 13–9
|- align="center" bgcolor="#ffcccc"
| 23
| December 15
| Denver
| 
| Dirk Nowitzki (27)
| Erick Dampier (15)
| José Juan Barea (9)
| American Airlines Center19,969
| 13–10
|- align="center" bgcolor="#ccffcc"
| 24
| December 17
| @ Toronto
| 
| Jason Terry, Dirk Nowitzki (27)
| Dirk Nowitzki (10)
| Jason Terry (8)
| Air Canada Centre18,832
| 14–10
|- align="center" bgcolor="#ffcccc"
| 25
| December 19
| @ New Jersey
| 
| Dirk Nowitzki (24)
| Erick Dampier (7)
| Jason Kidd (7)
| Izod Center9,889
| 14–11
|- align="center" bgcolor="#ccffcc"
| 26
| December 21
| @ Washington
| 
| Jason Terry (25)
| James Singleton (13)
| Jason Kidd (11)
| Verizon Center15,582
| 15–11
|- align="center" bgcolor="#ccffcc"
| 27
| December 23
| Memphis
| 
| Dirk Nowitzki (21)
| Erick Dampier (9)
| Jason Kidd (11)
| American Airlines Center20,200
| 16–11
|- align="center" bgcolor="#ccffcc"
| 28
| December 25
| @ Portland
| 
| Dirk Nowitzki (30)
| Jason Kidd (12)
| Jason Kidd (10)
| Rose Garden20,643
| 17–11
|- align="center" bgcolor="#ffcccc"
| 29
| December 26
| @ Utah
| 
| Jason Terry (26)
| Jason Kidd, Dirk Nowitzki, Erick Dampier (8)
| Jason Kidd (9)
| EnergySolutions Arena19,911
| 17–12
|- align="center" bgcolor="#ccffcc"
| 30
| December 28
| @ L.A. Clippers
| 
| Josh Howard (29)
| Brandon Bass, Josh Howard, Erick Dampier (9)
| Josh Howard (7)
| Staples Center16,685
| 18–12
|- align="center" bgcolor="#ccffcc"
| 31
| December 30
| Minnesota
| 
| Jason Terry (29)
| Dirk Nowitzki (13)
| Jason Kidd (16)
| American Airlines Center20,264
| 19–12

|- align="center" bgcolor="#ccffcc"
| 32
| January 2
| Philadelphia
| 
| Dirk Nowitzki (31)
| Erick Dampier (14)
| Jason Kidd (9)
| American Airlines Center20,327
| 20–12
|- align="center" bgcolor="#ffcccc"
| 33
| January 4
| @ Memphis
| 
| Dirk Nowitzki (28)
| José Juan Barea, Jason Kidd (6)
| Jason Kidd (5)
| FedExForum11,731
| 20–13
|- align="center" bgcolor="#ccffcc"
| 34
| January 6
| L.A. Clippers
| 
| Dirk Nowitzki (34)
| Jason Kidd (10)
| José Juan Barea, Jason Kidd (8)
| American Airlines Center19,794
| 21–13
|- align="center" bgcolor="#ccffcc"
| 35
| January 8
| New York
| 
| Josh Howard (19)
| Brandon Bass (11)
| Dirk Nowitzki (7)
| American Airlines Center19,779
| 22–13
|- align="center" bgcolor="#ffcccc"
| 36
| January 9
| @ Phoenix
| 
| Dirk Nowitzki (19)
| Dirk Nowitzki (7)
| Jason Kidd (7)
| US Airways Center18,422
| 22–14
|- align="center" bgcolor="#ffcccc"
| 37
| January 11
| @ Sacramento
| 
| Jason Terry (33)
| Dirk Nowitzki (8)
| Jason Kidd (7)
| ARCO Arena12,294
| 22–15
|- align="center" bgcolor="#ffcccc"
| 38
| January 13
| @ Denver
| 
| Dirk Nowitzki (44)
| Dirk Nowitzki (14)
| Jason Kidd (7)
| Pepsi Center14,158
| 22–16
|- align="center" bgcolor="#ffcccc"
| 39
| January 14
| New Orleans
| 
| Jason Terry (28)
| Dirk Nowitzki (13)
| Jason Kidd (7)
| American Airlines Center19,947
| 22–17
|- align="center" bgcolor="#ccffcc"
| 40
| January 17
| Utah
| 
| Dirk Nowitzki (39)
| Brandon Bass (9)
| Jason Kidd (15)
| American Airlines Center20,325
| 23–17
|- align="center" bgcolor="#ccffcc"
| 41
| January 19
| @ Philadelphia
| 
| Dirk Nowitzki (24)
| Jason Kidd (12)
| Jason Kidd (6)
| Wachovia Center14,503
| 24–17
|- align="center" bgcolor="#ffcccc"
| 42
| January 21
| @ Milwaukee
| 
| Dirk Nowitzki (30)
| Erick Dampier (8)
| Jason Terry (5)
| Bradley Center13,898
| 24–18
|- align="center" bgcolor="#ccffcc"
| 43
| January 23
| @ Detroit
| 
| Dirk Nowitzki (26)
| Dirk Nowitzki (7)
| Jason Kidd (10)
| The Palace of Auburn Hills22,076
| 25–18
|- align="center" bgcolor="#ffcccc"
| 44
| January 25
| @ Boston
| 
| Jason Terry (27)
| Dirk Nowitzki, Erick Dampier, Jason Kidd (7)
| Jason Kidd (5)
| TD Banknorth Garden18,624
| 25–19
|- align="center" bgcolor="#ccffcc"
| 45
| January 28
| Golden State
| 
| Jason Terry (22)
| Brandon Bass, Erick Dampier (11)
| Jason Kidd (9)
| American Airlines Center19,864
| 26–19
|- align="center" bgcolor="#ccffcc"
| 46
| January 31
| @ Miami
| 
| Dirk Nowitzki (30)
| Dirk Nowitzki (7)
| Jason Kidd (11)
| American Airlines Arena19,600
| 27–19

|- align="center" bgcolor="#ccffcc"
| 47
| February 2
| @ Orlando
| 
| Dirk Nowitzki (29)
| Erick Dampier (7)
| Jason Kidd (8)
| Amway Arena16,551
| 28–19
|- align="center" bgcolor="#ccffcc"
| 48
| February 4
| Portland
| 
| Josh Howard (23)
| Dirk Nowitzki (11)
| Jason Kidd (10)
| American Airlines Center19,767
| 29–19
|- align="center" bgcolor="#ffcccc"
| 49
| February 5
| @ Utah
| 
| Josh Howard (18)
| Dirk Nowitzki (6)
| Jason Kidd (8)
| EnergySolutions Arena19,911
| 29–20
|- align="center" bgcolor="#ccffcc"
| 50
| February 7
| Chicago
| 
| Dirk Nowitzki (44)
| Erick Dampier (10)
| Jason Kidd (10)
| American Airlines Center20,349
| 30–20
|- align="center" bgcolor="#ccffcc"
| 51
| February 10
| Sacramento
| 
| Antoine Wright, Josh Howard (23)
| Erick Dampier (16)
| Jason Kidd (12)
| American Airlines Center19,667
| 31–20
|- align="center" bgcolor="#ffcccc"
| 52
| February 12
| Boston
| 
| Dirk Nowitzki (37)
| Dirk Nowitzki (8)
| Jason Kidd (10)
| American Airlines Center20,285
| 31–21
|- align="center" bgcolor="#ccffcc"
| 53
| February 18
| New Jersey
| 
| Josh Howard (24)
| Josh Howard (10)
| Jason Kidd (10)
| American Airlines Center19,878
| 32–21
|- align="center" bgcolor="#ffcccc"
| 54
| February 20
| @ Houston
| 
| José Juan Barea (26)
| Dirk Nowitzki (11)
| José Juan Barea, Jason Kidd (5)
| Toyota Center18,195
| 32–22
|- align="center" bgcolor="#ccffcc"
| 55
| February 21
| Sacramento
| 
| Brandon Bass, Josh Howard (20)
| James Singleton (12)
| Jason Kidd (11)
| American Airlines Center20,223
| 33–22
|- align="center" bgcolor="#ffcccc"
| 56
| February 24
| @ San Antonio
| 
| Josh Howard (19)
| James Singleton (14)
| Jason Kidd (4)
| AT&T Center18,797
| 33–23
|- align="center" bgcolor="#ccffcc"
| 57
| February 25
| Milwaukee
| 
| Josh Howard (27)
| Brandon Bass (11)
| Jason Kidd (9)
| American Airlines Center19,558
| 34–23
|- align="center" bgcolor="#ccffcc"
| 58
| February 27
| Oklahoma City
| 
| Dirk Nowitzki (41)
| Dirk Nowitzki, James Singleton (9)
| Jason Kidd (13)
| American Airlines Center20,007
| 35–23

|- align="center" bgcolor="#ccffcc"
| 59
| March 1
| Toronto
| 
| Dirk Nowitzki (24)
| James Singleton (16)
| Jason Kidd (15)
| American Airlines Center19,688
| 36–23
|- align="center" bgcolor="#ffcccc"
| 60
| March 2
| @ Oklahoma City
| 
| Dirk Nowitzki (28)
| James Singleton (6)
| Dirk Nowitzki (6)
| Ford Center18,527
| 36–24
|- align="center" bgcolor="#ccffcc"
| 61
| March 4
| San Antonio
| 
| Josh Howard (29)
| Dirk Nowitzki (12)
| Jason Kidd (9)
| American Airlines Center20,316
| 37–24
|- align="center" bgcolor="#ffcccc"
| 62
| March 5
| @ New Orleans
| 
| Dirk Nowitzki (27)
| Erick Dampier (9)
| Jason Terry (4)
| New Orleans Arena17,230
| 37–25
|- align="center" bgcolor="#ccffcc"
| 63
| March 7
| Washington
| 
| Dirk Nowitzki (34)
| Dirk Nowitzki (9)
| Jason Kidd (11)
| American Airlines Center20,150
| 38–25
|- align="center" bgcolor="#ccffcc"
| 64
| March 10
| @ Phoenix
| 
| Dirk Nowitzki (34)
| Dirk Nowitzki (13)
| Dirk Nowitzki, José Juan Barea (4)
| US Airways Center18,422
| 39–25
|- align="center" bgcolor="#ccffcc"
| 65
| March 11
| @ Portland
| 
| Dirk Nowitzki (29)
| Dirk Nowitzki, Jason Kidd (10)
| Jason Kidd (10)
| Rose Garden20,286
| 40–25
|- align="center" bgcolor="#ffcccc"
| 66
| March 13
| @ Golden State
| 
| Dirk Nowitzki (27)
| James Singleton (11)
| Jason Kidd (11)
| Oracle Arena18,751
| 40–26
|- align="center" bgcolor="#ffcccc"
| 67
| March 15
| @ L.A. Lakers
| 
| Jason Terry (29)
| James Singleton (10)
| Jason Kidd (9)
| Staples Center18,997
| 40–27
|- align="center" bgcolor="#ccffcc"
| 68
| March 17
| Detroit
| 
| Dirk Nowitzki (30)
| Erick Dampier (13)
| José Juan Barea (8)
| American Airlines Center20,427
| 41–27
|- align="center" bgcolor="#ffcccc"
| 69
| March 19
| @ Atlanta
| 
| Dirk Nowitzki (23)
| Dirk Nowitzki (12)
| Jason Kidd (6)
| Philips Arena17,499
| 41–28
|- align="center" bgcolor="#ccffcc"
| 70
| March 20
| @ Indiana
| 
| Dirk Nowitzki (23)
| James Singleton (11)
| José Juan Barea (6)
| Conseco Fieldhouse17,232
| 42–28
|- align="center" bgcolor="#ccffcc"
| 71
| March 25
| Golden State
| 
| Jason Terry, Dirk Nowitzki (26)
| Erick Dampier (10)
| José Juan Barea, Jason Kidd (7)
| American Airlines Center19,862
| 43–28
|- align="center" bgcolor="#ffcccc"
| 72
| March 27
| Denver
| 
| Dirk Nowitzki (26)
| Dirk Nowitzki (11)
| José Juan Barea, Jason Terry (4)
| American Airlines Center20,310
| 43–29
|- align="center" bgcolor="#ffcccc"
| 73
| March 29
| @ Cleveland
| 
| Dirk Nowitzki (20)
| Ryan Hollins (12)
| Jason Kidd (8)
| Quicken Loans Arena20,562
| 43–30
|- align="center" bgcolor="#ccffcc"
| 74
| March 31
| @ Minnesota
| 
| Dirk Nowitzki (23)
| Dirk Nowitzki (12)
| Jason Kidd (13)
| Target Center12,111
| 44–30

|- align="center" bgcolor="#ccffcc"
| 75
| April 1
| Miami
| 
| Dirk Nowitzki (30)
| Josh Howard, Brandon Bass (8)
| Jason Kidd (11)
| American Airlines Center20,021
| 45–30
|- align="center" bgcolor="#ffcccc"
| 76
| April 3
| @ Memphis
| 
| Dirk Nowitzki (35)
| Dirk Nowitzki (9)
| Jason Kidd (10)
| FedExForum15,126
| 45–31
|- align="center" bgcolor="#ccffcc"
| 77
| April 5
| Phoenix
| 
| Dirk Nowitzki (28)
| James Singleton, Brandon Bass (6)
| Jason Kidd (20)
| American Airlines Center20,301
| 46–31
|- align="center" bgcolor="#ccffcc"
| 78
| April 8
| Utah
| 
| Dirk Nowitzki (31)
| Erick Dampier (10)
| Jason Kidd (10)
| American Airlines Center20,017
| 47–31
|- align="center" bgcolor="#ccffcc"
| 79
| April 10
| New Orleans
| 
| Dirk Nowitzki, Josh Howard (25)
| Brandon Bass (13)
| Jason Kidd (15)
| American Airlines Center20,370
| 48–31
|- align="center" bgcolor="#ffcccc"
| 80
| April 12
| @ New Orleans
| 
| Dirk Nowitzki (29)
| Dirk Nowitzki (14)
| Jason Kidd (6)
| New Orleans Arena16,640
| 48–32
|- align="center" bgcolor="#ccffcc"
| 81
| April 13
| Minnesota
| 
| Dirk Nowitzki (34)
| Erick Dampier (13)
| Jason Kidd (8)
| American Airlines Center19,900
| 49–32
|- align="center" bgcolor="#ccffcc"
| 82
| April 15
| Houston
| 
| Jason Terry (23)
| Dirk Nowitzki (15)
| Jason Kidd (12)
| American Airlines Center20,350
| 50–32

Playoffs

|- align="center" bgcolor="#ccffcc"
| 1
| April 18
| @ San Antonio
| W 105–97
| Josh Howard (25)
| Erick Dampier (11)
| Jason Kidd (5)
| AT&T Center18,797
| 1–0
|- align="center" bgcolor="#ffcccc"
| 2
| April 20
| @ San Antonio
| L 84–105
| Jason Terry (16)
| Dirk Nowitzki (6)
| Jason Kidd (5)
| AT&T Center18,797
| 1–1
|- align="center" bgcolor="#ccffcc"
| 3
| April 23
| San Antonio
| W 88–67
| Dirk Nowitzki (20)
| Erick Dampier (9)
| José Juan Barea (6)
| American Airlines Center20,491
| 2–1
|- align="center" bgcolor="#ccffcc"
| 4
| April 25
| San Antonio
| W 99–90
| Josh Howard (28)
| Dirk Nowitzki (13)
| Jason Kidd (7)
| American Airlines Center20,829
| 3–1
|- align="center" bgcolor="#ccffcc"
| 5
| April 28
| @ San Antonio
| W 106–93
| Dirk Nowitzki (31)
| Erick Dampier (12)
| Jason Kidd (6)
| AT&T Center18,797
| 4–1
|-

|- align="center" bgcolor="#ffcccc"
| 1
| May 3
| @ Denver
| L 95–109
| Dirk Nowitzki (28)
| Dirk Nowitzki (10)
| José Juan Barea (5)
| Pepsi Center19,631
| 0–1
|- align="center" bgcolor="#ffcccc"
| 2
| May 5
| @ Denver
| L 105–117
| Dirk Nowitzki (35)
| Dirk Nowitzki (9)
| Jason Kidd (7)
| Pepsi Center19,890
| 0–2
|- align="center" bgcolor="#ffcccc"
| 3
| May 9
| Denver
| L 105–106
| Dirk Nowitzki (33)
| Dirk Nowitzki (16)
| Jason Kidd (5)
| American Airlines Center20,620
| 0–3
|- align="center" bgcolor="#ccffcc"
| 4
| May 11
| Denver
| W 119–117
| Dirk Nowitzki (44)
| Dirk Nowitzki (13)
| Jason Kidd (6)
| American Airlines Center20,523
| 1–3
|- align="center" bgcolor="#ffcccc"
| 5
| May 13
| @ Denver
| L 110–124
| Dirk Nowitzki (32)
| Dirk Nowitzki (10)
| Jason Kidd (9)
| Pepsi Center19,962
| 1–4
|-

Awards and records

Awards

Week/Month
 Dirk Nowitzki was named Western Conference Player of the Week for games played from November 23 through November 29.
 Dirk Nowitzki was named Western Conference Player of the Week for games played from December 7 through December 13.
 Dirk Nowitzki was named Western Conference Player of the Month for games played in April.

All-Star
 Dirk Nowitzki was voted to his 8th NBA All-Star Game.

Season
 Jason Terry, NBA Sixth Man of the Year Award
 Dirk Nowitzki, 1st Team All-NBA

Transactions

Free agents

Additions
{| cellspacing="0"
| valign="top" |

Subtractions

References

Dallas Mavericks seasons
Dallas
Dallas
Dallas